The synchronized swimming competitions at the 2001 Southeast Asian Games in Kuala Lumpur took place from 16 to 17 September 2001 at the National Aquatics Centre within the National Sports Complex. It was one of four aquatic sports at the Games, along with diving, swimming and water polo.

Participating nations
A total of 13 athletes from five nations competed in synchronized swimming at the 2001 Southeast Asian Games:

Medalists

Medal table

Women

References

2001
Southeast Asian Games
2001 Southeast Asian Games events